Pih Jik (also Romanized as Pīh Jīk; also known as Pīh Chīk) is a village in Solduz Rural District, in the Central District of Naqadeh County, West Azerbaijan Province, Iran. At the 2006 census, its population was 24, in 7 families.

References 

Populated places in Naqadeh County